Global Media may refer to:

Global Media Group (formerly Controlinveste), a Portuguese media holding company founded by Portuguese sports mogul and FC Porto S.A.D.'s shareholder Joaquim Oliveira
Global Media & Entertainment, a British media company founded by Ashley Tabor-King

See also
Global Media AIDS Initiative, an umbrella organization that unites and motivates media companies around the world to use their influence, resources, and creative talent to address AIDS
Global Media Arts (known as GMA Network), a media company based in Diliman, Quezon County, Philippines
Global Media and Communication, a triannual peer-reviewed academic journal covering the field of communication studies
The Global Media Monitoring Project, an international study of gender in the news media
Global Media Manager, a product of Beaver Group, a UK software company